Euphorbia milii, the crown of thorns, Christ plant,  or Christ thorn, is a species of flowering plant in the spurge family Euphorbiaceae, native to Madagascar. The species name commemorates Baron Milius, once Governor of Réunion, who introduced the species to France in 1821. It is imagined that the species was introduced to the Middle East in ancient times, and legend associates it with the crown of thorns worn by Christ. It is commonly used as an ornamental houseplant that can be grown in warmer climates. The common name is due to the thorns and deep red bracts referring to the crown thorn Jesus had to wear during his crucifixion and his blood.

Description

The flowers are small, subtended by a pair of conspicuous petal-like bracts, variably red, pink or white, up to  broad. Wat Phrik in Thailand claims to be the home of the world's tallest Christ thorn plant. The plant thrives between spring and summer but produces flowers all year round.

Toxicity
The sap is moderately poisonous, and causes irritation on contact with skin or eyes. If ingested, it causes severe stomach pain, irritation of the throat and mouth, and vomiting. The poisonous ingredients have been identified as phorbol esters. It is very toxic to domesticated animals such as, horses, sheep, cats and dogs. For humans it is mildly toxic and only acts as an irritant.

Uses

Pesticide 
The plant itself has proven to be an effective  molluscicide and a natural alternative to pest control. The World Health Organization (WHO) has recommended the usage of Euphorbia milii in aiding snail control. Especially in endemic countries. Schistosomiasis is an infectious disease from freshwater parasites, carried by snails. Extracts from the plant are used to control the snail population to avoid getting infected from a parasite.

Varieties
E. milii is a variable species, and several varieties have been described; some of these are treated as distinct species by some authors. E. milii var. splendens (syn. E. splendens) is considered to be the living embodiment of the supreme deity in Bathouism, a minority religion practiced by the Bodo people of Eastern India and Nepal.

Euphorbia milii var. bevilaniensis  (Croizat) Ursch & Leandri 1955
Euphorbia milii var. hislopii  (N.E.Br.) Ursch & Leandri 1955 (syn. E. hislopii)
Euphorbia milii var. imperatae  (Leandri) Ursch & Leandri 1955
Euphorbia milii var. longifolia  Rauh 1967
Euphorbia milii var. milii
Euphorbia milii var. roseana  Marn.-Lap. 1962
Euphorbia milii var. splendens  (Bojer ex Hook.) Ursch & Leandri 1955
Euphorbia milii var. tananarivae  (Leandri) Ursch & Leandri 1955
Euphorbia milii var. tenuispina  Rauh & Razaf. 1991
Euphorbia milii var. tulearensis  Ursch & Leandri 1955
Euphorbia milii var. vulcanii  (Leandri) Ursch & Leandri 1955

Cultivation
Euphorbia milii can be propagated from cuttings. E. milii is not hardy, and does not tolerate temperatures below . In temperate areas it needs to be grown under glass in full sun. During the summer it may be placed outside in a sheltered spot, when all risk of frost is absent. The species and the variety E. milii var. splendens have both gained the Royal Horticultural Society’s Award of Garden Merit.

Gallery

References

milii
Endemic flora of Madagascar
Data deficient plants
Taxa named by Charles des Moulins